The   was held on 8 February 1981 in Keihin Film Theatre, Tsurumi, Kanagawa, Japan.

Awards
 Best Film: Zigeunerweisen
 Best New Actor: Tatsuo Yamada – Crazy Thunder Road
 Best Actor: Masato Furuoya  – Hipokuratesu-tachi
 Best Actress: Hiroko Yakushimaru – Tonda Couple
 Best New Actress: Keiko Oginome – Kaichō-on
 Best Supporting Actor: Morio Kazama – Shiki Natsuko, Yūgure made
 Best Supporting Actress: Ran Itoh – Hipokuratesu-tachi
 Best Director: Seijun Suzuki – Zigeunerweisen
 Best New Director: Shinji Sōmai – Tonda Couple
 Best Screenplay: Shoichi Maruyama – Tonda Couple, The Beast To Die
 Best Cinematography: Kazue Nagatsuka – Zigeunerweisen
 Best Independent Film: Crazy Thunder Road
 Special Prize:
Tai Kato (Career)
Yūsaku Matsuda (Career)

Best 10
 Zigeunerweisen
 Tonda Couple
 Crazy Thunder Road
 The Beast to Die
 Nihyaku Sankōcho
 Disciples of Hippocrates
 Onna no Hosomichi: Nureta Kaikyo
 Kamisama no Kureta Akanbō
 Tekkihei, Tonda
 The Castle of Cagliostro

References

Yokohama Film Festival
Yokohama
Yokohama Film Festival
Yokohama Film Festival